State Road 501 (SR 501) is a three-mile (5 km) long north–south highway entirely within Cocoa, Florida, in the United States.  It southern terminus is an intersection with King Street (SR 520); its northern terminus is an intersection with SR 524 just south of an interchange with State Road 528 and Grissom Parkway. The road is also known as Clearlake Road. Until the mid-1980s, it was State Road 503A.

SR 501 is a commercial artery of Cocoa, with shopping centers on both sides of the street. A campus of Brevard Community College is also located on Clearlake Road.

Major intersections

References

External links

501
501